Paul-Louis Halley (16 September 1934 – 6 December 2003) was a French businessman who co-founded the retail company Promodès, which later merged with Carrefour. Much of his fortune came from his 11% stakeholding in Carrefour. He was estimated to have a fortune of £2.2bn, putting him at 104th on the Forbes World's Richest People list in 2003.  He died in a plane crash in 2003.

Paul-Louis Halley founded the retail company Promodès in 1961, along with his father and brother. The company merged with Carrefour in 1999, with Halley as the principal shareholder.

Death
He was killed in a Socata TBM 700 aircraft crash on 6 December 2003, during an approach to Oxford Airport. The plane went into an uncontrolled roll, killing Halley, his wife, and the pilot. The Air Accidents Investigation Branch could find no cause for the crash. There were no technical problems with the plane, and investigators could only speculate that the pilot was distracted by a bird as he tried to land.

The inquest into the death of Paul-Louis Halley took place in Oxford, England, in late October 2005. A jury returned a verdict of accidental death.

References

1934 births
2003 deaths
20th-century French businesspeople
French billionaires
Victims of aviation accidents or incidents in England
People from Cherbourg-Octeville